Miss Colombia 2021 was the 68th edition of the Miss Colombia pageant. It was held at the Julio Cesar Turbay Ayala Convention Center in Cartagena de Indias, Colombia on November 14, 2021.

At the end of the event, María Fernanda Aristizábal of Quindío crowned Valentina Espinosa of Bolívar as Señorita Colombia 2021–2022, who represented Colombia at Miss Supranational 2022 and concluded as Top 12 semifinalist.

Results

Final results 
  The contestant was a Finalist/Runner-up in an International pageant.

  The contestant was a Semi-Finalist in an International pageant.

Special awards

Pageant

Final
The results of the preliminary competition, which consisted of the swimsuit competition, the evening gown competition, and the closed-door interview, will determine the 10 semi-finalists who will advance to the first cut. Internet voting is still being implemented and fans can vote for their favorite delegate to advance to the finals. The top 10 will compete in the swimsuit and evening gown competitions and then narrow down to the top 5. The first 5 will compete. in the preliminary round of questions and answers. The last catwalk will be recovered, after which Señorita Colombia 2021 and its four finalists will be announced.

Judges
Ariadna Gutierrez – Colombian model, actress, influencer and Miss Colombia 2014
Gabriel De Obarro – President and founder of IndiGO advisors
Tadashi Campos Makabe – Specialist in general medicine and expert in haute couture design
David Raya Gonzalez – Research engineer

Contestants 

25 contestants competed for the title.

Notes

Post-pageant notes 

 Valentina Espinosa of Bolivar competed at Miss Supranational 2022 in Nowy Sącz, Poland and was one the 12 semi-finalists. She also obtained the title of Miss Supra Model of the Americas.
 Natalia López of Quindío competed at Miss International 2022 in Tokyo, Japan and finished as 3rd runner-up. It is Colombia's second consecutive 3rd runner-up finish after the 2019 edition.
 Karen Ortiz of Huila competed at Miss United Continents 2022 in Portoviejo, Ecuador and finished as 2nd runner-up.
 Juliana Habib of Córdoba was appointed as the representative of Colombia in the inaugural Miss Charm International pageant in Ho Chi Minh City, Vietnam. Habib was one of the Top 6 finalists.

References

External links
 

2021 in Colombia
Miss Colombia
Colombia
November 2021 events in Colombia